Leptolobieae is a Neotropical, early-branching monophyletic clade of the flowering plant subfamily Faboideae or Papilionaceae that are mostly found in South America.

Description
This tribe is composed of five genera, two of which were originally included in the genus Acosmium (Guianodendron and Leptolobium) and one of which was originally assigned to the genus Diplotropis (Staminodianthus). All of these genera were traditionally included in the tribe Sophoreae. However, recent molecular phylogenetic analyses resolved these five genera into a strongly-supported monophyletic clade, which warranted the reinstatement of the tribe Leptolobieae. A potential morphological synapomorphy for the tribe is: "tufts of minute colleter-like glands in the axils of bract and bracteoles".

References

 
Leptolobieae
Fabaceae tribes